The 1909 Edinburgh West by-election was held on 17 May 1909.  The by-election was held due to the resignation of the incumbent Liberal Unionist MP, Lewis McIver.  It was won by the Liberal Unionist candidate James Avon Clyde, who was unopposed.

References

Edinburgh West by-election
1900s elections in Scotland
Edinburgh West by-election
West, 1909
Unopposed by-elections to the Parliament of the United Kingdom (need citation)
1900s in Edinburgh
Edinburgh West by-election